Jennifer Latheef (born 1973) is a daughter of Mohamed Latheef, a leading Maldivian politician and government critic. She also worked as a Maldivian journalist and photographer for a short period of time. 

According to an Amnesty International report released in 2003, Jennifer Latheef 
is an artist and video film producer particularly focusing on the prevalence of sexual abuse in the country. She is known for holding views critical of the government and against censorship, and this is believed to be the main reason for her continued detention. She is currently detained under house arrest in Malé. In addition, it is believed that Jennifer Latheef’s continued detention may be a measure by the government to limit the activities of her father, Mohamed Latheef, a Maldivian politician currently living in exile in Sri Lanka where he is engaged in a campaign of peaceful political opposition to the Government of Maldives. 

Jennifer Latheef was sentenced to 10 years' imprisonment on October 18, 2005, convicted of "terrorism" for joining a protest in September 2003 against deaths in prison and political repression. Amnesty International adopted her as a Prisoner of Conscience during her time in prison and campaigned for her release.

She was detained in Maafushi Prison on the Kaafu Atoll, 18 miles south of the capital, Malé. She was reportedly not being given regular access to necessary medication.

She was released on August 16, 2006. She was informed of her release from house arrest through a presidential pardon. Initially, she refused to accept the government offer of release on two grounds: firstly, that her release should have been unconditional and not through a pardon, since this would imply that she had committed a recognizably criminal offence – which she had not; and secondly, she insisted that the other four political prisoners convicted at the same trial should also be released. After consulting with friends and other human rights defenders, Jennifer Latheef agreed to accept the offer of release from house arrest.

See also
IFEX - Latheef under house arrest
ARTICLE 19 - Report by International Press Freedom and Freedom of Expression Mission to the Maldives
Minivan News - Jennifer Latheef Resigns From MDP

References

Amnesty International prisoners of conscience held by the Maldives
Living people
Maldivian activists
Maldivian journalists
Maldivian prisoners and detainees
People imprisoned on charges of terrorism
1973 births
20th-century Maldivian writers
21st-century Maldivian writers